Francis Aungier, 1st Baron Aungier of Longford (1558–1632), also known as Lord Aungier, was the progenitor of the Earldom of Longford, member of the House of Lords, Privy Councillor for Ireland, and Master of the Rolls in Ireland under James I and Charles I.

Early life
Francis was born in 1558 in Cambridge, England, the eldest son of Richard Aungier, Esq., and Rose Steward. His father was a barrister and a member of Gray's Inn, and also a substantial 
landowner. Francis attended Westminster School, and Trinity College, Cambridge, before entering Gray's Inn in 1577. He became a member of several jurisdictions, and was the reader of the Inn in 1602. He was a sufficiently gifted lawyer to earn the praise of Francis  Bacon. His father was murdered in his chambers in 1597, soon after his third election as Treasurer of Gray's Inn, and his body thrown into the Thames: the younger brother of Francis, Richard Aungier, was hanged for the crime at Tyburn on 25 January 1598.

Later years
In consequence of his first marriage, Aungier settled at East Clandon, Surrey during the 1590s, where he became a friend of Sir William More of Loseley. In 1609, King James I appointed him to the Irish Privy Council, as well as to the position of Master of the Rolls for Ireland. He was also knighted at Greenwich  by the King that same year. He was re-appointed Master of the Rolls for Ireland by King Charles I in 1625.

Aungier attended the House of Lords in 1614 and served as commissioner of the Plantation of Munster in 1616 and of  County Longford in 1620. In 1619, he was appointed as a commissioner of the Great Seal of Ireland following the death of Archbishop Thomas Jones. In 1621, he was created Lord Aungier, Baron of Longford by patent, which stated that he descended from the Counts of Aungier. 
 
He purchased the lands of the White Friars Monastery  in  Dublin,  where he resided: there, in 1677, Aungier Street was dedicated in honour of his family.

Marriage and issue
Aungier was married three times, and had several children through his marriages.

He married first a Fitzgerald, sister of the 14th Earl of Kildare, and had five children:
Gerald Aungier, 2nd Baron Aungier of Longford, who married Jane Onslow, daughter of Sir Edward Onslow
Ambrose Aungier, Chancellor of St. Patrick's Cathedral, who married Grisel Bulkeley, daughter of  the Archbishop of Dublin, Lancelot Bulkeley, and was the father of Francis Aungier, 1st Earl of Longford, Gerald Aungier, and Ambrose Aungier, 2nd Earl of Longford
Elizabeth Aungier, who married Simon Caryll, Richard Barne, and John Machell
Lettice Aungier, who married Edward Cherry of Dublin, Sir William Danvers, and Sir Henry Holcroft.
Thomas Aungier
Francis Aungier (died young)

He married secondly Anne Barne, daughter of Sir George Barne III and Anne Gerrard, and had two children:
George Aungier
Frances Aungier

He married thirdly Margaret Cave, daughter of Sir Thomas Cave (died 1613) of Stanford Hall and Eleanor St. John. They had no issue.

References

1632 deaths
Barons in the Peerage of Ireland
Peers of Ireland created by James I
1558 births
English MPs 1589
English MPs 1597–1598
People from Cambridge
People educated at Westminster School, London
Alumni of Trinity College, Cambridge
Members of Gray's Inn
Masters of the Rolls in Ireland